The following is a list of journalists killed in Venezuela while reporting or on account of their journalism.

List 
According to the Committee to Protect Journalists, 10 journalists have been killed in Venezuela since 1992, eight of them after 2002, during the Bolivarian Revolution:

Additionally, journalist Alí Domínguez was murdered in 2019. The Venezuelan police believe his murder was politically motivated.

See also 

 Censorship in Venezuela
 Mass media in Venezuela
 List of journalists killed in Guatemala
 List of journalists killed in Honduras
 List of journalists killed in Mexico

References 

Venezuela
Journalists
 
Venezuela
Journalists killed
Venezuela